Awet Habtom (born 1 January 1998) is an Eritrean cyclist, who last rode for UCI Continental team .

Major results
2015
 1st  Road race, National Junior Road Championships
2016
 National Junior Road Championships
2nd Road race
2nd Time trial
 7th Time trial, UCI Junior Road World Championships
2017
 African Road Championships
1st  Team time trial
3rd Time trial
8th Road race
 8th Overall La Tropicale Amissa Bongo
1st  Mountains classification
2018
 3rd Overall Tour of Antalya
1st  Young rider classification

References

External links

1998 births
Living people
Eritrean male cyclists
21st-century Eritrean people